Dimitrios Kiliaras (born 23 March 1986) is a Greek professional footballer who plays as a midfielder for Super League 2 club Irodotos.

Career
Kiliaras began playing football with local club Irodotos, before moving to Gamma Ethniki side Ergotelis in 2002. As the club celebrated consecutive promotions to reach the Alpha Ethniki (later renamed to Superleague) in 2004, Kiliaras made his top-flight debut during the 2004–05 season. He impressed with his performances for Ergotelis in the Superleague, earning a transfer to Panionios on 16 May 2008 for a reported 500K Euros. Playing the same position as Panionios Uruguayan stars at the time Álvaro Recoba and Fabián Estoyanoff, Kiliaras did not manage to maintain a place in the club's starting XI, and was subsequently loaned out back to Ergotelis in 2009.

After his contract with Panionios ended, Kiliaras moved to fellow Superleague side Levadiakos. He then spent one season in Cyprus with AEP Paphos before returning to Greece signing for Football League side Panachaiki. Kiliaras eventually went back to playing in the Gamma Ethniki, featuring for 2015–16 Group 3 champions Sparti in 2016. On 1 July 2016, Kiliaras returned to a Gamma Ethniki side Ergotelis for the third time in his career, 6 years past his loan spell from Panionios.

In January 2017, Kiliaras requested to be released from his contract with Ergotelis, expressing his desire to return to his very first club, Irodotos, playing in Heraklion's top regional division, and help them in their struggle to return to the Gamma Ethniki. Ergotelis reluctantly granted the player's wish and his contract was therefore terminated on 22 January 2017. Kiliaras' transfer made an impact for Irodotos, as the club won four trophies that season, including the Heraklion Football Clubs Association double, the Greek Football Amateur Cup and the Amateurs' Super Cup. Kiliaras actually secured the final trophy for Irodotos by scoring the winning goal (0–1) in the 74th minute. In total, Kiliaras scored 8 goals in 16 caps for Irodotos.

In the summer of 2017, Kiliaras moved to Corfu, signing with local FCA A1 club Kronos Argyrades, whom he helped gain consecutive promotions to the Gamma Ethniki and the Football League during a two-year stay. In the summer of 2019, Kiliaras returned to Crete, and signed a contract with local FCA A1 Championship club Almyros.

Personal life
Born in Heraklion, Kiliaras began playing football at a young age, when his father, a retired Irodotos footballer, signed him up at the infrastructure segments of his former club. His younger brother Giannis is also a professional footballer, currently playing for Greek Super League 2 club Ergotelis. They played together for Ergotelis in the Superleague during the 2007–08 season.

Honours

Club

Sparti
Gamma Ethniki: Winner: 2015–16

Irodotos
Greek Football Amateur Cup: Winner: 2016–17
Amateurs' Super Cup: Winner: 2017

Kronos Argyrades
Gamma Ethniki: Winner: 2018–19

References

External links
 
Myplayer.gr Profile
Profile at Onsports.gr

1986 births
Living people
Greece under-21 international footballers
Ergotelis F.C. players
Panionios F.C. players
Levadiakos F.C. players
AEP Paphos FC players
Panachaiki F.C. players
Super League Greece players
Cypriot First Division players
Panegialios F.C. players
GAS Ialysos 1948 F.C. players
Iraklis Psachna F.C. players
Association football midfielders
Footballers from Heraklion
Greek footballers